Tae-wook, also spelled Tae-uk, is a Korean masculine given name. Its meaning depends on the hanja used to write each syllable of the name. There are 20 hanja with the reading "tae" and 11 hanja with the reading "wook" on the South Korean government's official list of hanja which may be registered for use in given names.

People with this name include:
Kim Jung-tae (born Kim Tae-wook, 1972) South Korean actor
Bae Soo-bin (born Yoon Tae-wook, 1976), South Korean actor
Choi Tae-uk (born 1981), South Korean football player
Kim Tae-wook (born 1987), South Korean football player

Fictional characters with this name include:
Kang Tae-wook, in 2013 South Korean television series Goddess of Marriage

See also
List of Korean given names

References

Korean masculine given names